Kovai Cora cotton or Kovai Kora cotton is a type of saree made in the Coimbatore region in Tamil Nadu, India. It has been recognized as a Geographical indication by the Government of India in 2014–15. The Devanga community are pioneers in weaving Kovai Kora cotton saris. 82 Weaver cooperative Societies in Coimbatore, Tiruppur and Erode are authorised to sell Kovai Kora cotton saris.

About
Kovai Kora cotton is made from a blend of silk and cotton. A superior quality cotton yarn is mixed with traditional silk to produce kora cotton. The sarees have bright colored border designs with occasional use of shining zari. The required designs are weaved using the loom using combinations of colored cotton and silk threads and the borders are added later.

Weaving
The kora cotton sarees are woven on traditional hand-looms. The saree is woven by traditional weaving families in the districts of Coimbatore, Tiruppur and Erode in the Kongu Nadu region of Tamil Nadu. Sirumugai in Coimbatore district is the major producer of kora cotton sarees.

Sales
Eighty-two co-operative societies in the districts of Coimbatore, Tiruppur and Erode have been certified as authorized dealers of Kovai Kora cotton by the Government of Tamil Nadu. The sales of kora cotton sarees have seen a decline over the last three decades due to change in dressing preferences of women. Soft silk sarees look grander and colorful with designer blouses. Lower demand and higher remunerations for weaving soft silk sarees have led to weavers switching to weaving silk sarees. The GI tag helped increase sales by 15% in 2014–15. But the spike in demand was able to convince weavers to switch back to weaving kora sarees and the sales declined the following year. The Government of Tamil Nadu sells the sarees through government run Co-optex stores.

Competition
Kora cotton sarees weaved from traditional hand-looms face competition from cheaper cotton sarees weaved through power-looms. High excise duty on yarn used by the hand-looms leading to higher production costs and greater efficiency of power-looms have contributed to the fall in demand for hand woven kora cotton sarees. Weavers have often demanded assistance from the Government of Tamil Nadu for subsidizing production.

Geographical Indication
In 2014, the Government of Tamil Nadu applied for Geographical Indication for Kovai Kora cotton sarees. The Government of India recognized it as a Geographical indication officially since the year 2014–15.

References

Saris
Geographical indications in Tamil Nadu
Tamil culture
Indian handicrafts
Erode district
Coimbatore district
Tiruppur district
Textile industry in Tamil Nadu
Cotton industry in India